Ercis may refer to:
 Erciş, a district of Van province in the east of Turkey
 European Research Center for Information Systems (ERCIS)